The 2016–17 Polish Cup was the 60th edition of the Polish Volleyball Cup tournament.

ZAKSA Kędzierzyn-Koźle won the 6th Polish Cup in club history after beating the title defenders, PGE Skra Bełchatów.

Final four
 Venue: Hala Stulecia, Wrocław 
 All times are Central European Time (UTC+01:00).

Semifinals
|}

Final

|}

Final standings

Awards

Most Valuable Player	
  Dawid Konarski (ZAKSA Kędzierzyn-Koźle)
Best Server
  Artur Szalpuk (PGE Skra Bełchatów)
Best Receiver	
  Kévin Tillie (ZAKSA Kędzierzyn-Koźle)
Best Defender
  Robert Milczarek (PGE Skra Bełchatów)
	
Best Blocker	
  Łukasz Wiśniewski (ZAKSA Kędzierzyn-Koźle)
Best Opposite
  Dawid Konarski (ZAKSA Kędzierzyn-Koźle)
Best Setter
  Benjamin Toniutti (ZAKSA Kędzierzyn-Koźle)

See also
 2016–17 PlusLiga

References

External links
 Official website

Polish Cup
Polish Cup
Polish Cup
Polish Cup